The 2017 NCHC Tournament was the fourth tournament in league history. It was played between March 10 and March 18, 2017. Quarterfinal games were played at home team campus sites, while the final four games were played at the Target Center in Minneapolis, Minnesota. By winning the tournament, Minnesota-Duluth received the NCHC's automatic bid to the 2017 NCAA Division I Men's Ice Hockey Tournament.

Format
The first round of the postseason tournament features a best-of-three games format. All eight conference teams participate in the tournament. Teams are seeded No. 1 through No. 8 according to their final conference standing, with a tiebreaker system used to seed teams with an identical number of points accumulated. The top four seeded teams each earn home ice and host one of the lower seeded teams.

The winners of the first round series advance to the Target Center for the NCHC Frozen Faceoff. The Frozen Faceoff uses a single-elimination format. Teams are re-seeded No. 1 through No. 4 according to the final regular season conference standings.

Conference standings
Note: GP = Games played; W = Wins; L = Losses; T = Ties; PTS = Points; GF = Goals For; GA = Goals Against

Bracket
Teams are reseeded after the first round

* denotes overtime periods

Results
All times are local.

Quarterfinals

(1) Denver vs. (8) Colorado College

(2) Minnesota–Duluth vs. (7) Miami

(3) Western Michigan vs. (6) Nebraska-Omaha

(4) North Dakota vs. (5) St. Cloud State

Semifinals

(1) Denver vs. (4) North Dakota

(2) Minnesota–Duluth vs. (3) Western Michigan

Third place

(1) Denver vs. (3) Western Michigan

Championship

(2) Minnesota–Duluth vs. (4) North Dakota

Tournament awards

Frozen Faceoff All-Tournament Team
F Alex Iafallo* (Minnesota-Duluth)
F Tyson Jost (North Dakota)
F Dominic Toninato (Minnesota-Duluth)
D Tucker Poolman (North Dakota)
D Neal Pionk (Minnesota-Duluth)
G Hunter Miksa (Minnesota-Duluth)

Notes:
 * Most Valuable Player(s)

References

NCHC Men's Ice Hockey Tournament
2017
Ice hockey in Minnesota
College sports in Minnesota
2017 in sports in Minnesota
March 2017 sports events in the United States